Chérif Ousmane Sarr (born 2 August 1986) is a footballer who plays as a midfielder for French lower-league club Vierzon.

Career
Sarr was born in Fatick, Senegal. He signed for then Ligue 2 side Troyes AC in the summer of 2007 from Grenoble Foot 38. He rescinded the contract on 29 September 2009 despite his deal lasting until June 2011.

He trained with the Danish champions F.C. Copenhagen in July 2010 and other Danish clubs, primarily Randers FC, showed interest in him. He signed a one-year contract with Randers FC on 3 August 2010.

References

External links
 
 
 

1986 births
Living people
People from Fatick Region
Association football midfielders
Senegalese footballers
Serer sportspeople
Danish Superliga players
Danish 1st Division players
Ligue 2 players
Championnat National 3 players
Grenoble Foot 38 players
ES Troyes AC players
Randers FC players
Viborg FF players
USM Saran players
Vierzon FC players
Senegalese expatriate footballers
Senegalese expatriate sportspeople in England
Expatriate footballers in England
Senegalese expatriate sportspeople in France
Expatriate footballers in France
Senegalese expatriate sportspeople in Denmark
Expatriate men's footballers in Denmark